A constitutional referendum was held in Gabon and Moyen Congo on 5 May 1946 as part of the wider French constitutional referendum. The proposed new constitution was rejected by 64% of voters in the territory, and 53% of voters overall.

Results

References

1946 referendums
May 1946 events in Africa
1946
1946 in Gabon
1946
1946 in Moyen-Congo
1946
1946 elections in France
Constitutional referendums in France